Hassalstrongylus dollfusi is a nematode worm of the genus Hassalstrongylus, first described under the name Longistriata dollfusi by Carlos Díaz-Ungría in 1963 who named it dollfusi as an homage to French parasitologist Robert-Philippe Dollfus. The species was transferred to the genus Hassalstrongylus in 1971 by Marie-Claude Durette-Desset. Serrano et al. redescribed the species in 2021.

Morphology

Hassalstrongylus dollfusi is a medium-sized nematode (3-10 mm in length), generally uncoiled, sometimes loosely coiled in 1–3 spirals.{}

According to Serrano et al. (2021), characters of Hassalstrongylus dollfusi males are: the morphology of the caudal bursa and the peculiar shape of the distal tip of the spicules. Characters of the female are: the dorsal cuticular inflation at ovejector level and the subventral postvulvar alae supported by hypertrophied struts.

Biology and distribution

The species is parasitic in the small intestine of rodents. Hassalstrongylus dollfusi was first described in 1963 as a parasite of a wild house mouse, Mus musculus, in Venezuela and was never reported again for the next six decades. In 2021 a paper based on a large survey of native rodents showed that the species was actually present as a parasite in five species of wild native cricetid rodents in Argentina: Oligoryzomys fornesi, Oligoryzomys flavescens, Oligoryzomys nigripes, Holochilus chacarius and Akodon azarae. The authors wrote that Hassalstrongylus dollfusi showed a strong preference for host species of Oligoryzomys, which appear to act as primary hosts.

References 

Nematodes described in 1963
Heligmonellidae
Parasitic nematodes of mammals
Parasites of rodents